AV and variants may refer to:

Arts and entertainment
 A.V. (film), a 2005 Hong Kong film directed by Pang Ho-Cheung
 Adult video, a pornographic film
 Audiovisual, possessing both a sound and a visual component
 AV The Hunt, a 2020 Turkish thriller film directed by Emre Akay

Businesses and organizations
 America Votes, an American 501(c)4 organization that promotes progressive causes
 Anonymous for the Voiceless, a grassroots animal rights organisation specialising in street activism
 Aston Villa F.C., an English football club
 AV Akademikerverlag GmbH & Co. KG, an imprint of the German group VDM Publishing
 Avaya, a technology company formerly listed on the New York Stock Exchange with symbol "AV"
 Avianca (IATA airline code AV)
 Aviva, British insurance company, listed on the New York Stock Exchange and London Stock Exchange as "AV"
 AeroVironment, manufacturer of unmanned military aircraft and systems
 Amusement Vision, former name of Ryu Ga Gotoku Studio

Places
 Anguilla (obsolete NATO diagram AV)
 Antelope Valley, a valley in Southern California
 Province of Avellino, a province of Italy

Science and technology

Anatomy and medicine
 Aerobic vaginitis, vaginal infection associated with overgrowth of aerobic bacteria
 Arteriovenous (disambiguation)
 Atrioventricular (disambiguation)

Electronics and computing
 Access violation, a computer software error
 Age verification, system for checking a user's age
 Antivirus software, used to prevent, detect and remove malicious software
 Audio and video connector, a cable between two devices
 Analog video

Fluid dynamics
 Annular velocity, speed of the drilling fluid's movement in a column called an annulus in oil wells
 Apparent viscosity, shear stress divided by shear rate

Vehicles
 AV (cyclecar)
 Bavarian A V, an 1853 steam locomotive model
 AV, the designation for seaplane tender in the United States Navy's ship classification system
 Autonomous vehicles

Other uses in science and technology
 A-type main-sequence star, in astronomy, abbreviated A V
 Aperture value mode, setting on photo cameras that allows to choose a specific aperture value

Other uses
 Alternative vote, an electoral system used to elect a single winner from a field of more than two candidates
 Approval voting, a non-ranking vote system
 Authorised Version of the Bible (also known as King James Version)
 Av, a month in the Hebrew calendar
 av, the Avar language's ISO 639-1 code
 Av. or Ave, an abbreviation for Avenue (disambiguation)
 Ꜹ or AV from Latin aurum (avrvm), a numismatic abbreviation for "gold"
  A.V., the putative mark of ébéniste Adam Weisweiler
 Aviation, abbreviated Av, in military use

See also
 A5 (disambiguation)
 α5 (disambiguation)
 AV idol, a type of Japanese porn star